Coiled-coil and C2 domain-containing protein 2A that in humans is encoded by the CC2D2A gene.

Function 

This gene encodes a coiled-coil and calcium binding domain protein that appears to play a critical role in cilia formation.

Clinical significance 

Mutations in the CC2D2A gene are associated with Meckel syndrome as well as Joubert syndrome.

References

External links

Further reading